This is a list of the members of the Australian House of Representatives in the 13th Australian Parliament, which was elected at the 1931 election on 19 December 1931. The incumbent Australian Labor Party led by Prime Minister of Australia James Scullin was defeated by the newly formed opposition United Australia Party (descended from the Nationalist Party of Australia) led by ex-Labor Joseph Lyons with coalition partner the Country Party led by Earle Page.

Notes

References

Members of Australian parliaments by term
20th-century Australian politicians